The University of Twente (Dutch: Universiteit Twente; , abbr. ) is a public technical university located in Enschede, Netherlands.
The university has been placed in the top 170 universities in the world by multiple central ranking tables. In addition, the UT was ranked the best technical university in The Netherlands by Keuzegids Universiteiten, the most significant national university ranking.
The UT collaborates with Delft University of Technology, Eindhoven University of Technology and the Wageningen University and Research Centre under the umbrella of 4TU and is also a partner in the European Consortium of Innovative Universities (ECIU).

History

The university was founded in 1961 as Technische Hogeschool Twente or (THT). After Delft University of Technology and Eindhoven University of Technology, it became the third polytechnic institute in the Netherlands to become a university. The institution was later renamed to Universiteit Twente (University of Twente) in 1986, as the result of the changes in the Dutch Academic Education Act in 1984.

The Dutch government's decision to locate the country's third technical university in Enschede, the main city of Twente, had much to do with the north-eastern province's rich manufacturing industry (textiles, metal, electrical engineering, chemicals). Another important consideration was the fact that the local economy needed a boost to compensate for the dwindling textile industry. Just as the fact that the municipality of Enschede made the Drienerlo estate available for the first campus University of the Netherlands.

Campus
The University of Twente was built on the former country estate of Drienerlo, situated between Hengelo and Enschede. The 140-hectare estate consists of woodland, meadows and water. Architects Van Tijen and Van Embden designed the first — and so far only — Dutch campus university along American lines where students and staff live, work and pursue their leisure activities on campus.

The Student Union, which is run entirely by students, manages several premises, including the student social centre (De Pakkerij) and study centre (Wallstreet) in Enschede and The Water sports complex on the Twentekanaal.

Rankings 

According to the Times Higher Education Ranking, the University of Twente is considered one of the 200 most prestigious universities globally. The university performed particularly strongly in the Industry, Innovation and Infrastructure 2021 ranking. Here, the university was ranked eleventh in the world rankings. At the same time, psychology and social sciences also performed well, receiving 101–125 in the world rankings.

In the Shanghai Ranking 2021, the University of Twente's Geoinformation and Earth Observation Sciences were awarded. In the field of remote sensing, the university landed among the top ten universities in the world. The commitment in this area will be further expanded in the coming years.

According to Keuzegids Universiteiten, the most significant national university ranking, the University of Twente is the best technical university in the Netherlands.

Organization

Administration

The current rector magnificus of the university is professor Tom Veldkamp. The other two members of the executive board are Vinod Subramaniam (president of the executive board) and Machteld Roos (vice-president)

Faculties

There are five faculties at the University of Twente; each faculty is in turn organized into several departments:
 Behavioural, Management and Social Sciences (BMS) – i.a. Communication studies, psychology, public administration, educational science & technology, European studies, environmental & energy management and Risk management
 Engineering Technology (ET) – i.a. Mechanical engineering, civil engineering, industrial design engineering and sustainable energy technology.
 Electrical Engineering, Mathematics and Computer Science (EEMCS) – i.a. Electrical engineering, applied mathematics, interaction technology, internet science & Technology and computer science.
 Science and Technology (ST) – i.a. Chemical engineering, applied physics, biomedical engineering, health sciences, advanced technology and nanotechnology.
 Faculty of Geo-information Sciences and Earth Observation (ITC) – i.a. spatial engineering, cartography, geo-information science & earth observation.

Next to the programmes administered by the faculties mentioned above, University College Twente offers the broad honours BSc programme in Technology and Liberal Arts and Sciences, or ATLAS for short, and the Twente Graduate School offers post graduate education (PhD and PDEng). Since 2019, this study is part of the faculty ITC.

Bachelor's and Master's Degrees

The University of Twente has the following faculties with corresponding bachelor- and master programmes:

BMS (Behavioural, Management & Social Sciences)
Bachelor programmes
 Communication Science
 Educational Science and Technology
 Industrial Engineering and Management
 International Business Administration
 Management, Society & Technology
 Psychology
Master programmes
 Business Administration
 Communication Science
 Educational Science and Technology
 European Studies (incl. Double Diploma)
 Leraar VHO Maatschappijleer en Maatschappijwetenschappen
 Industrial Engineering and Management
 Psychology
 Philosophy of Science, Technology and Society
 Public Administration
 Science Education and Communication
 Environmental and Energy Management
 Research Master Methodology and Statistics for the BBSS

ET (Engineering Technology)
Bachelor programmes
 Civil Engineering
 Industrial Design Engineering
 Mechanical Engineering
Master programmes
Civil Engineering and Management
Construction Management and Engineering
Industrial Design Engineering
Mechanical Engineering
Sustainable Energy Technology

EEMCS (Electrical Engineering, Mathematics & Computer Science) (a.k.a. EWI)
Bachelor programmes
 Applied Mathematics
 Business Information Technology
 Technical Computer Science
 Creative Technology
 Electrical Engineering
Master programmes
 Applied Mathematics
 Business Information Technology
 Computer Science
 Electrical Engineering
 Embedded Systems
 Interaction Technology
 Systems and Control
 Internet Science and Technology

ST (Science and Technology) (a.k.a. TNW)
Bachelor programmes
 Applied Physics (Dutch, Technische Natuurkunde)
 Chemical Science & Engineering
 Biomedical Engineering (Dutch, Biomedische technologie)
 Technical Medicine (Dutch, Technische geneeskunde)
 Advanced Technology
 Health Sciences (Dutch, Gezondheidswetenschappen)
Master programmes
Applied Physics
Biomedical Engineering
Chemical Engineering
Nanotechnology
Technical Medicine
Health Sciences

ITC (International Institute for Geo-Information Science and Earth Observation)
Bachelor programmes
 Technology and Liberal Arts & Sciences (ATLAS) 
Master programmes
Geo-information Science and Earth Observation
Spatial Engineering
Geographical Information Management and Applications

Academics

Research

Research institutes
MESA+ Institute for Nanotechnology
 TechMed Centre 
 Digital Society Institute (DSI)

Knowledge and research centres
Center for Philosophy of Technology and Engineering Science (CEPTES)
Center for European Studies (CES)
Center for Higher Education Policy Studies (CHEPS)
Center for healthcare operations improvement & research (CHOIR)
Centre for integrated manufacturing and development (CIPV)
Center for clean technology and environmental policy (CSTM)
Nikos – Dutch institute for knowledge intensive entrepreneurship
Science, Technology, and Policy Studies (STePS)
Twente Water Centre (TWC)
4TU Resilience Engineering Centre
4TU Centre of Excellence for Ethics and Technology
Max Planck Center for Fluid Dynamics

Education

The degree programs at the University of Twente range from business administration and psychology to applied physics, engineering and biomedical technology.

In the applied sciences, the emphasis is on nanotechnology, process technology, engineering, information and communication technology, and the biomedical sciences.

So far, the UT has produced over 1,000 spin-off companies and start-up companies; more than any other Dutch university. UT is also one of the founders of Novel-T, formerly Stichting Kennispark Twente, a startup accelerator and support program for university spin-offs.

Timeline of rectors
 1963–1967: Gerrit Berkhoff (d. 1996)
 1967–1971: Jo Vlugter
 1971–1974: Pieter Zandbergen
 1974–1976: Jan Kreiken (d. 2001)
 1976–1979: Izak Willem van Spiegell (d. 2005)
 1979–1982: Harry van den Kroonenberg (d. 1996)
 1982–1985: Wiebe Draijer (d. 2007)
 1985–1988: Harry van den Kroonenberg (second term)
 1988–1992: Jos de Smit
 1992–1997: Theo Popma (d. 2013)
 1997–2004: Frans van Vught
 2005–2009: Henk Zijm
 2009–2016: Ed Brinksma
 2016–2020: Thom Palstra
 2020–present: Tom Veldkamp

Notable alumni 

Albert van den Berg, professor of physics and 2009 winner of the Spinoza Prize
Ank Bijleveld, Dutch politician – Minister of Defence
Bas Lansdorp, co-founder and CEO of Mars One
Cees Links, Wi-Fi Innovator
Dirk-Willem van Gulik, founder of the Apache Software Foundation
Fred Teeven, former Dutch politician – State Secretary for Security and justice
Giancarlo Guizzardi, creator of the Unified Foundational Ontology and the OntoUML language
Gom van Strien, Dutch politician – member of the Senate
Han Polman, Dutch politician – King's Commissioner of Zeeland
Henry Franken, co-founder and managing director of BiZZdesign
Iain Baikie, professor of physics and winner of the Swan Medal 
Jaap Haartsen, inventor of Bluetooth 
Marleen Veldhuis, swimmer – Olympic, World and European Champion
Merlyna Lim, professor, Canada Research Chair, and member of Royal Society of Canada College
Peter Flach, professor of artificial intelligence at the University of Bristol
Yasemin Çegerek, MP of the Labour Party
Jitse Groen, founder of Takeaway.com
Mary Goretti Kitutu, Minister of Energy and Mineral Development, Uganda
Piet Bergveld, inventor of the ion-sensitive field-effect transistor (ISFET) sensor

Notes and references

External links

 Official Website

 
Technical universities and colleges in the Netherlands
Educational institutions established in 1961
1961 establishments in the Netherlands
Education in Overijssel
Buildings and structures in Enschede